The Brighton Applefest was created in 1975 by the merchants of Brighton, Ontario, Canada to promote the Brighton area, and the apple-based culture around it. It is now Brighton's largest yearly event, taking place annually during the last week of September, and can draw up to 30,000 visitors. The attendance at the 2011 festival, which did not feature the typical car show, was estimated at 20,000.

The festival offers a variety of attractions. Its primary draw is its parade, and a street festival featuring fresh foods and local crafts. Other attractions include hayrides, a classic car show, live music, and a children's amusement park, in addition to a vendors selling local arts and crafts.

The festival went on hiatus in 2020 and returned in 2021.

References

External links

Festivals in Ontario
Tourist attractions in Northumberland County, Ontario
Food and drink festivals in Canada
Apple festivals
Festivals established in 1975